Martin Ignatius Welsh (October 1, 1882 – January 4, 1953) was a United States district judge of the United States District Court for the Northern District of California.

Education and career

Born in San Jose, California, Welsh read law to enter the bar in 1912. He was in private practice from 1912 to 1932, also serving as a deputy district attorney and a Superior Court judge of Sacramento County, California in 1914. He was a United States Commissioner for the United States District Court for the Northern District of California from 1914 to 1919. He served as a councilman on the Sacramento City Council from 1928 to 1929, and was Mayor of Sacramento in 1929. He was a member of the Board of Education of Sacramento in 1931, and served as a Judge of the Superior Court of California County of Sacramento from 1932 to 1939.

Federal judicial service

On June 21, 1939, Welsh was nominated by President Franklin D. Roosevelt to a new seat on the United States District Court for the Northern District of California created by 52 Stat. 584. He was confirmed by the United States Senate on July 11, 1939, and received his commission on July 14, 1939. He assumed senior status due to a certified disability on January 1, 1947, serving in that capacity until his death on January 4, 1953.

References

Sources
 

1882 births
1953 deaths
California state court judges
Mayors of Sacramento, California
Sacramento City Council members
Judges of the United States District Court for the Northern District of California
United States district court judges appointed by Franklin D. Roosevelt
20th-century American judges
United States federal judges admitted to the practice of law by reading law